Isakas is a Lithuanian masculine given name derived from Isaac. Notable people with the name include:

Isakas Anolikas (1903–1943), Lithuanian cyclist 
Isakas Vistaneckis (1910–2000), Lithuanian chess master

See also
Isaka (name)

Lithuanian masculine given names